This is a complete list of paintings by Edvard Munch (12 December 186323 January 1944) a Norwegian symbolist painter, printmaker and an important forerunner of expressionist art. His best-known composition, The Scream (1893), is part of a series The Frieze of Life, in which Munch explored the themes of love, fear, death, melancholia and anxiety.

Around 1789 paintings are provisionally credited Edvard Munch. His career as a painter lasted from 1880 to 1943. Munch possessed 1006 of his paintings when he died. He gave all these paintings as a testamentary gift to The Municipality of Oslo when he wrote down his will on 18 April 1940, right after the Germans had occupied Norway. Munch died on 23 January 1944, and all of the paintings he left are now in the Munch Museum in Oslo, Norway.

The Munch Museum is the most important collection of works of any medium by Edvard Munch. Other major collections include the National Gallery in Oslo, which holds the famous 1893 tempera and crayon on cardboard version of The Scream amongst other major paintings.

This list is based upon Gerd Woll's catalogue raisonné from 2008, the numbers and English titles on each painting in this list are identical with the numbers and English titles that are given there.

See also

 Munch Museum

References

Notes

Munch, Edvard